The 1983 WAFL season was the 99th season of the West Australian Football League in its various incarnations. The season opened on 31 March and concluded on 17 September with the 1983 WAFL Grand Final contested between Claremont and Swan Districts.

South Fremantle, after a disappointing 1982, and Claremont dominated the competition for most of the year before Swans – after a slow start due to numerous injuries with four losses from eight matches – came home very strongly for a second premiership win in a row. East Perth, with a new coach and required to play fourteen men new to league football, missed the finals for only the second time in eighteen seasons and indeed only the fifth since their dynasty between 1956 and 1961, though a reserves premiership after a drawn preliminary final was partial compensation.

The continuing fall in WAFL attendances despite the growth of Perth's metropolitan population, loss of many star players to the VFL, and resultant financial difficulties for all clubs, led the government of Brian Burke to undergo a review of the WAFL's needs, especially club finances and ground leases, but future seasons did not prove the move successful. In an effort to update their images East Fremantle adopted the moniker "Sharks" and West Perth the "Falcons", and despite considerable scepticism both clubs have retained these nicknames to the present. The blue and whites dominated the pre-season and recovered from a very bad start in the home-and-away rounds to reach fourth position in the last round, but were out of their depths against the top three – who lost only three matches to the remaining five teams all season. The Sharks did win the experimental "Emu Export" lightning carnival held at Subiaco Oval on May 14 and 15, which was regarded by the WAFL as a major flop and never repeated.

For the first time the WAFL allowed six home-and-away matches to be played on Sunday and televised direct to Perth viewers, but attendances at these matches were about half what would have happened otherwise and the WAFL abandoned this for the 1984 season.

Home-and-away season

Round 1

Round 2 (Easter weekend)

Round 3

Round 4

Round 5

Round 6

Round 7

Emu Export Lightning Cup

First round

|- style="background:#ccf;"
| Winning team
| Winning team score
| Losing team
| Losing team score
| Ground
| Crowd
| Date
|- style="background:#fff;"
||| 11.5 (71) |||| 0.5 (5) ||Subiaco Oval|| 7950 ||Saturday, 14 May
|- style="background:#fff;"
||| 4.3 (27) |||| 1.5 (11) ||Subiaco Oval|| 7950 ||Saturday, 14 May
|- style="background:#fff;"
||| 7.3 (45) |||| 6.5 (41) ||Subiaco Oval|| 7950 ||Saturday, 14 May
|- style="background:#fff;"
||| 9.6 (60) |||| 5.5 (35) ||Subiaco Oval|| 7950 ||Saturday, 14 May
|- style="background:#fff;"
||| 8.5 (53) |||| 5.0 (30) ||Subiaco Oval|| 7950 ||Saturday, 14 May
|- style="background:#fff;"
||| 8.7 (55) |||| 6.2 (38) ||Subiaco Oval|| 7950 ||Saturday, 14 May
|- style="background:#fff;"
||| 8.4 (52) |||| 3.6 (24) ||Subiaco Oval|| 7950 ||Saturday, 14 May
|- style="background:#fff;"
||| 6.8 (44) |||| 1.7 (13) ||Subiaco Oval|| 7950 ||Saturday, 14 May

Second round

|- style="background:#ccf;"
| Winning team
| Winning team score
| Losing team
| Losing team score
| Ground
| Crowd
| Date
|- style="background:#fff;"
||| 6.5 (41) |||| 5.2 (32) ||Subiaco Oval|| 3870 ||Sunday, 15 May
|- style="background:#fff;"
||| 12.6 (78) |||| 4.3 (27) ||Subiaco Oval|| 3870 ||Sunday, 15 May
|- style="background:#fff;"
||| 5.9 (39) |||| 6.2 (38) ||Subiaco Oval|| 3870 ||Sunday, 15 May
|- style="background:#fff;"
||| 2.12 (24) |||| 2.7 (19) ||Subiaco Oval|| 3870 ||Sunday, 15 May

Final

Round 8

Round 9

Round 10 (Foundation Day)

Round 11

Round 12

Round 13

Round 14

Round 15

State of Origin match

Round 16

Round 17

Round 18

Round 19

Round 20

Round 21

Ladder

Finals

First semi-final

Second semi-final

Preliminary final

Grand Final

Notes
Cousins lost on a countback, but was awarded a retrospective Medal in 1997.

References

External links
Official WAFL website
Australian Football: WAFL Season 1983

West Australian Football League seasons
WAFL